Sarah Kirsch (16 April 1935 – 5 May 2013) was a German poet.

Biography
Sarah Kirsch was originally born Ingrid Bernstein in Limlingerode, Prussian Saxony but had changed her first name to Sarah in order to protest against her father's anti-semitism. She studied biology in Halle and literature at the Johannes R. Becher Institute for Literature in Leipzig. In 1965, she co-wrote a book of poems with writer Rainer Kirsch, to whom she was married for ten years. She protested against East Germany's expulsion of Wolf Biermann in 1976, which led to her exclusion from the Socialist Unity Party of Germany (SED). One year later she left the country herself, nevertheless being critical of the west as well. She is mainly known for her poetry, but she also wrote prose and translated children's books into German.

According to complete review, "the great German-language post-war poets were largely East German (or Austrian) born in the mid to late 1930s which included towering figures such as Volker Braun, Heinz Czechowski" and Sarah Kirsch who was "the most prominent female representative of that generation."

She won many prizes and honours including the German international literary Petrarca-Preis in 1976, the Peter-Huchel Prize in 1993 and the Georg Büchner Prize in 1996.
From 1960-1968 she was married to lyricist Rainer Kirsch.
Sarah Kirsch died in May 2013 following a brief illness.

Bibliography (selection)

 Berlin – Sonnenseite. Deutschlandtreffen der Jugend in der Hauptstadt der DDR (1964), photo reportage, together with Thomas Billhardt and Rainer Kirsch
 Gespräch mit dem Saurier (1965), poems, together with Rainer Kirsch
 Die betrunkene Sonne (1966), children's book. Illustrations by Erich Gürtzig
 Landaufenthalt (1967), poems
 Zaubersprüche (1973), poems
 Trauriger Tag
 Die Pantherfrau. Fünf unfrisierte Erzählungen aus dem Kassettenrecorder (1973), Prose
 Die ungeheuren bergehohen Wellen auf See (1973), Prose
 Es war dieser merkwürdige Sommer (1974), poems selections
 Caroline im Wassertropfen (1975), children's book. Illustrations by Erdmut Oelschläger
 Zwischen Herbst und Winter (1975), children's book together with Ingrid Schuppan
 Rückenwind. Gedichte (1976), poems
 Im Sommer (1977)
 Musik auf dem Wasser (1977)
 Wintergedichte (1978)
 Katzenkopfpflaster (1978), poems
 Sieben Häute. Gedichte 1962–1979 (1979)
 Drachensteigen (1979), poems
 Trennung (1979), poems
 Wind und Schatten, together with Kota Taniuchi
 La Pagerie (1980), Prose, poems
 Geschlechtertausch (1980), together with Irmtraud Morgner and Christa Wolf
 Hans mein Igel (1980), children's book after the Brothers Grimm, Illustrations by Paula Schmidt
 Papiersterne (1981), set by music by Wolfgang von Schweinitz
 Erdreich (1982), poems
 Zwischen Herbst und Winter (1983), Illustrations by Kurt Mühlenhaupt. Gertraud Middelhauve Verlag, 
 Katzenleben (1984), poems
 Landwege. Eine Auswahl 1980–1985 (1985), with an epilogue by Günter Kunert
 Hundert Gedichte und ein Gespräch über ihre Gedichte. (1985) (a selection from the books Landaufenthalt, Zaubersprüche, Rückenwind, Drachensteigen), Ebenhausen
 Reisezehrung (1986), Prose
 Irrstern (1987), Prose
 Book with poems by Sarah Kirsch and drawings by A. R. Penck in the Berlin „Edition Malerbücher“ (1987)
 Allerlei-Rauh. Eine Chronik (1988), Prose
 Luft und Wasser. Gedichte und Bilder, with pictures by Ingo Kühl, Edition Lutz Arnold in the Steidl Verlag, Göttingen 1988.
 Schneewärme. Gedichte (1989)
 Wintermusik (1989)
 Die Flut (1990), selection, compiled by Gerhard Wolf
 Schwingrasen (1991), Prose
 Spreu (1991), pictures diary
 Erlkönigs Tochter (1992), poems
 Das simple Leben (1994), Prose and poems
 Bodenlos (1996)
 Werke, Complete edition, five volumes in a slipcase (1999), DVA and dtv
 Katzen sprangen am Rande und lachten, poems and prose, selection by Franz-Heinrich Hackel, Manesse Verlag, Zürich 2000, 
 Sarah Kirsch and Christoph W. Aigner: Beim Malen bin ich weggetreten (2000), art book
 Schwanenliebe. Zeilen und Wunder (2001), lyrical miniatures
 Islandhoch, Tagebruchstücke (2002), Prose
 Kommt der Schnee im Sturm geflogen (2005), Prose
 Kuckuckslichtnelken (2006), Prose
 Regenkatze (2007), Prose (Lyrical diary)
 Sommerhütchen (2008)
 Krähengeschwätz. Deutsche Verlagsanstalt, München 2010, 
 Märzveilchen. Deutsche Verlags-Anstalt, München 2012, 
 Juninovember. Deutsche Verlagsanstalt, München 2014, 
 Ice Roses: Selected Poems, translated to English by Anne Stokes, Carcanet, 2014 
 Ænglisch. Prose; with an epilogue by Frank Trende. Deutsche Verlags-Anstalt, München 2015, 
 Freie Verse: 99 Gedichte, Manesse Verlag, Zürich 2020,

Resources

Sarah Kirsch by Mererid Hopwood (1997)

References

External links

1935 births
2013 deaths
People from Nordhausen (district)
People from the Province of Saxony
Socialist Unity Party of Germany members
East German writers
East German women
German women poets
Writers from Thuringia
Communist women writers
20th-century German poets
20th-century German women writers
German-language poets
Martin Luther University of Halle-Wittenberg alumni
Leipzig University alumni
Georg Büchner Prize winners